Franciscus Liberati (1615–1703) was a Roman Catholic prelate who served as Titular Archbishop of Ephesus (1688–1703).

Biography
Franciscus Liberati was born in 1615.
On 24 February 1688, he was appointed during the papacy of Pope Innocent XI as Titular Archbishop of Ephesus.
On 25 April 1688, he was consecrated bishop by Gasparo Carpegna, Cardinal-Priest of San Silvestro in Capite, with Odoardo Cibo, Titular Archbishop of Seleucia in Isauria, and 
Ercole Visconti, Titular Archbishop of Ephesus, serving as co-consecrators. 
He remained as Titular Archbishop of Tamiathis until his death on 18 April 1703.
 
While bishop, he was the principal co-consecrator of Petrus Draghi Bartoli, Titular Patriarch of Alexandria (1690).

References 

17th-century Roman Catholic titular archbishops
18th-century Roman Catholic titular archbishops
Bishops appointed by Pope Innocent XI
1615 births
1703 deaths